The South Australian regional leagues are the fourth level of soccer in South Australia, and the fifth nationally. The league consists of eight separate regional senior leagues and is administered by the Football Federation South Australia. The Limestone Coast Football Association, which include Portland SC from Victoria, is also run in affiliation with the Football Federation South Australia.

There is no promotion to NPL SA State League 2 however clubs may apply to join.

Member Clubs
Clubs in the different districts in 2023 are as follows:

References

External links
 Football Federation South Australia Website

Soccer in South Australia
fifth level football leagues in Asia